Juan Portocarrero, O.F.M. (died 8 March 1631) was a Roman Catholic prelate who served as Bishop of Almería (1602–1631).

Biography
Juan Portocarrero was ordained a priest in the Order of Friars Minor. On 26 August 1602, he was selected by the King of Spain and confirmed by Pope Leo XI as Bishop of Almería. He served as Bishop of Almería until his death on 8 March 1631. While bishop, he was the principal co-consecrator of Antonio Corrionero, Bishop of Islas Canarias (1615); Juan Zapata Osorio, Bishop of Zamora (1616); Enrique Pimentel Zúñiga, Bishop of Valladolid, (1619); and Garcerán Albañell, Archbishop of Granada (1621).

References 

1631 deaths
17th-century Roman Catholic bishops in Spain
Bishops appointed by Pope Leo XI
Franciscan bishops